The Canton of Châtel-sur-Moselle is a French former administrative and electoral grouping of communes in the Vosges département of eastern France and in the region of Lorraine. It covered an area directly to the north-west of Épinal. It was disbanded following the French canton reorganisation which came into effect in March 2015. It had 19,871 inhabitants (2012).

One of 13 cantons in the Arrondissement of Épinal, the Canton of Châtel-sur-Moselle had its administrative centre at Châtel-sur-Moselle.

Composition
The Canton of Châtel-sur-Moselle comprised the following 23 communes:

Badménil-aux-Bois
Bayecourt
Châtel-sur-Moselle
Chavelot
Damas-aux-Bois
Domèvre-sur-Durbion
Frizon
Gigney
Girmont
Hadigny-les-Verrières
Haillainville
Igney
Mazeley
Moriville
Nomexy
Oncourt
Pallegney
Rehaincourt
Sercœur
Thaon-les-Vosges
Vaxoncourt
Villoncourt
Zincourt

References

Chatel-sur-Moselle
2015 disestablishments in France
States and territories disestablished in 2015